The 2014–15 Serie D was the sixty-seventh edition of the top level Italian non-professional football championship. It represented the fourth tier in the Italian football league system.

It consisted of 167 teams, including the admitted Arzachena, Rieti and by repechage Biancoscudati Padova, Robur Siena and Sondrio, divided into six 18-team divisions, two 20-team divisions and a 19-team division.

Promotions
The nine division winners are automatically promoted to Lega Pro.

Playoffs
Teams placed second through fifth in each division enter a playoff tournament, after the regular season, where the nine winners compete among themselves with the best semifinalist and the finalist of Coppa Italia Serie D which determine three of the four semi-finalists. The fourth is the winner of Coppa Italia Serie D. The playoff winner (or eligible clubs among the playoff losers) could receive professional licence(s) in event of bankruptcy of a Serie C club (or clubs).

Relegations
In groups A-D the two last-placed teams (19th and 20th) will playoff with the 18th, if the 15th place is more than 8 points ahead of it and the 17th (or both), and if the 16th place is more than 8 points ahead of the 17th or 18th (or both); the losers are directly relegated. Otherwise the teams ranked 15th to 18th play a two-legged tie-break (15th vs 18th, and 16th vs 17th).
In group B the two last-placed teams (18th and 19th) will playoff with the 17th, if the 14th place is more than 8 points ahead of it and the 16th (or both), and if the 15th place is more than 8 points ahead of the 16th or 17th (or both); the losers are directly relegated. Otherwise the teams ranked 14th to 17th play a two-legged tie-break (14th vs 17th, and 15th vs 16th).
In groups C-E-F-G-H-I the two last-placed teams (17th and 18th) will playoff with the 16th, if the 13th place is more than 8 points ahead of it and the 15th (or both), and if the 14th place is more than 8 points ahead of the 15th or 16th (or both); the losers are directly relegated. Otherwise the teams ranked 13th to 16th play a two-legged tie-break (13th vs 16th, and 14th vs 15th).

Scudetto Serie D
The nine division winners enter a tournament which determines the overall Serie D champions and the winner is awarded the Scudetto Serie D.

Standings

Girone A

Teams 
Teams from Aosta Valley, Piedmont, Liguria and Lombardy

League table

Girone B

Teams 
Teams from Lombardy & Veneto

League table

Girone C

Teams 
Teams from Friuli-Venezia Giulia, Trentino-Alto Adige/Südtirol & Veneto

League table

Girone D

Teams 
Teams from Emilia-Romagna, Tuscany & Veneto

League table

Girone E

Teams 
Teams from Tuscany, Umbria & Lazio

League table

Girone F

Teams 
Teams from Abruzzo, Marche & Molise

League table

Girone G

Teams 
Teams from Lazio & Sardinia

League table

Girone H

Teams 
Teams from Apulia, Basilicata and Campania.

League table

Girone I

Teams 
Teams from Calabria, Campania and Sicily.

League table

Scudetto Dilettanti

First round
division winners placed into 3 groups of 3
group winners and best second-placed team qualify for semi-finals
rank in Discipline Cup and head-to-head will break a tie or ties in points for the top position in a group
Listed in order in Discipline Cup: Cuneo, Castiglione, Lupa Castelli Romani, Maceratese, Siena, Padova, Rimini, Andria, Akragas.

Group 1

Group 2

Group 3

Semi-finals

Final
On neutral ground.

Scudetto winners: Robur Siena

Promotion play-off

Promotion playoffs involved a total of 39 teams; four from Serie D divisions A to I (teams placed from 2nd through 5th except group D which has teams placed 2nd and 4th to 6th), with the best semifinalist, the finalist and the winner of Coppa Italia Serie D that are directly respectively admitted to the fourth and fifth rounds and the semi-final.

Rules

 First to third round 
 The first three rounds are one-legged matches played in the home field of the best-placed team.
 The games ending in ties are extended to extra time. The higher classified team is declared the winner if the game is still tied after extra time. Penalty kicks are not taken.
 First round matches 4th & 5th-placed teams within each division (A to C and E to I only); 3rd-placed team gets a bye to the second round, awaiting 4th-5th winner. For division D, 5th & 6th-placed teams play each other; 4th-placed team also gets a bye to the second round, awaiting 5th-6th winner.
 The 2nd-placed team and the second round winner play each other in the third round.

 Fourth and fifth round 
 The nine winners – one each from the nine Serie D divisions – qualify with division D 8th-placer Scandicci Calcio, as the best-ranked semifinalist of Coppa Italia Serie D to the fourth round, that was played in one-legged match in the home field of the best-placed team. 
 The five winners qualify with division D 3rd-placed Correggese, as the finalist of Coppa Italia Serie D to the fifth round, that is played in one-legged match in the home field of the best-placed team.
 The games ending in ties are extended to penalty kicks without playing extra time.

 Semifinals and final 
 The three 4th-round winners qualify for the semifinal round, joining division H 10th-placer Monopoli, as Coppa Italia Serie D winner.
 The semifinals and the final, with the respective winners, are in a one-legged match in a neutral ground.
 The games ending in ties are extended to penalty kicks without playing extra time.

 Repechages 
 The tournament results provide a list, starting with the winner, by which vacancies could be filled in Lega Pro.
 If the winner is not admitted to that league it gets €30,000, while the replacement (the finalist) instead gets €15,000.

First round
Played on 16 May 2015 (groups A-B), other groups on 17 May
Single-legged matches played at best-placed club's home field. 4th-placed team plays at home 5th-placed team (except division D, where 5th placer plays the 6th)

Second round
Played on 20 May 2015
Single-legged matches played at best-placed club's home field
Games ending in a tie are extended to extra time; if still tied, the higher-classified team wins

Third round
Played on 24 May 2015 
Single-legged matches played at best-placed club's home field
Games ending in a tie are extended to extra time; if still tied, the higher-classified team wins

 

Fourth round
Played on 31 May 2015 
Single-legged matches played at best-placed club's home field
Games ending in a tie are extended to penalty kicks without playing extra time
Scandicci qualified directly as the best ranked semifinalist of Coppa Italia Serie D

Fifth round
Played on 7 June 2015 
Single-legged matches played on best-placed club's home ground
Games ending in a tie are extended to penalty kicks without play extra time
Correggese qualified directly as the finalist of Coppa Italia Serie D

Semifinals
Played on 10 June 2015 
On home team's ground
Games ending in a tie are extended to penalty kicks without playing extra time
Monopoli qualified directly as the winner of Coppa Italia Serie D

Final
Played on 14 June 2015
On neutral ground at Stadio Enzo Blasone, Foligno
Game ending in a tie is extended to penalty kicks without playing extra time

Admitted to Lega Pro: Monopoli

Relegation play-off
Played on 24 May 2014
Single-legged matches played on best-placed club's home ground
In case of tied score, extra time is played; if score is still level, best-placed team wins
Team highlighted in green is saved, other is relegated to Eccellenza

Play-off for relegation play-out (Group F)
Played on 17 May

References

Serie D seasons
4
Italy